AP7 or AP-7 may refer to:
 2022 AP7, an asteroid
 AP-7 (drug), an NMDA receptor antagonist
 Autopista AP-7, a motorway in Spain
 , a 1919 US Navy troop transport and hospital ship